Gymnopilus aurantiacus is a species of mushroom-forming fungus in the family Hymenogastraceae.

Description

Habitat and distribution
Gymnopilus aurantiacus grows on conifer wood. Fruiting in July, it has been collected in Maine.

See also

 List of Gymnopilus species

References

aurantiacus
Fungi of North America
Fungi described in 1969
Taxa named by Lexemuel Ray Hesler